Ernocornutia paracatopta is a species of moth of the family Tortricidae. It is found in Napo Province, Ecuador.

The wingspan is 18 mm. The ground colour of the forewings is greyish brown with darker strigulation (fine streaks). The hindwings are cream with a brown admixture on the periphery and cream-grey strigulation.

References

Moths described in 2008
Euliini
Moths of South America
Taxa named by Józef Razowski